The Nocra prison camp was an Italian prison camp established on the island of Nocra, off the coast of Massawa, in Italian colony of Eritrea, that was used to intern political prisoners.

Years after the official end of the Second Italo-Abyssinian War, the Italian authorities sent Ethiopian and Eritrean intellectuals and political prisoners with their families there. It was dismantled in 1941 after British forces occupied the island after the Battle of Keren.

See also
 Italian concentration camps
 Italian East Africa

References

Dahlak Archipelago
Italian concentration camps
Italian Eritrea